The Bolivarian missions are a series of over thirty social programs implemented under the administration of former Venezuelan president Hugo Chávez and continued by Chávez's successor, Nicolás Maduro. The programs focus on helping the most disadvantaged social sectors and guaranteeing essential rights such as health, education and food. The created missions created include Mission Robinson (literacy), Mission Barrio Adentro (free medical coverage), and Mission Mercal (affordable food).

Using increasing oil prices of the early 2000s and funds not seen in Venezuela since the 1980s, Chávez created the "Bolivarian missions" in 2003, which were initially short-term projects dedicated to alleviating the largest socioeconomic problems facing Venezuela at the time. After enjoying political success, Chávez made the missions his central priority for his administration, directly overseeing their operations and increasing funding during electoral campaigns.

The development and promotion of economic resources, originating from the state-owned Petróleos de Venezuela (PDVSA), generated a political floor for the governmental management of that time, but that "as the years went by, many social missions lost their social perspective and focused their axis of action on political activities" characterized by discretionality and information opacity.

Types

Education 

 Mission Robinson (launched July 2003)uses volunteers to teach reading, writing, and arithmetic to Venezuelan adults.
 Mission Ribas (launched November 2003)provides remedial high school level classes to Venezuelan high school dropouts; named after independence hero José Félix Ribas. In 2004, about 600,000 students were enrolled in this night school programme, and paid a small stipend. They were taught grammar, geography and a second language.
 Mission Sucre (launched in late 2003)provides free and ongoing higher education courses to adult Venezuelans.

Electoral

Mission Florentino  was organized by Hugo Chávez to promote the option "No" in the Venezuelan recall referendum of 2004. The organizational centers of the Mission were named "Comando Maisanta" and were the ideological central headquarters for those who wished to keep Chávez as the President of Venezuela for the remainder of his presidential period.

Environmental

Mission Revolución Energética (Mission Energy Revolution)a campaign launched November 2006 to replace incandescent lightbulbs with more energy-efficient fluorescent bulbs.

Food and nutrition 

 Mission Mercalseeks to provide access to high-quality produce, grains, dairy, and meat at discounted prices. Seeks to provide Venezuela's poor increased access to nutritious, safe, and organic locally- and nationally grown foodstuffs. It also seeks to increase Venezuela's food sovereignty. Its concrete results, however, are highly debatable, as in 2007 the country is heavily more dependent on imported foodstuffs than it was in 1997, and has been facing chronic shortages in several basic supplies: milk, edible oils, sugar, cereals, eggs, and others.

Healthcare 

 Mission Barrio Adentro ("Mission Inside the Neighborhood")a series of initiatives (deployed in three distinct stages) to provide comprehensive and community health care (at both the primary (Consultorios y Clínicas Populares or popular clinics) and secondary (hospital) levels, in addition to preventive medical counsel to Venezuela's medically under-served and impoverished barrios.
 Mission Nevado – Named after the dog of Simón Bolívar, this program provides free medical services to pets (such as dogs) and their owners and handlers, most especially animals that have been rescued from torture and suffering from mistreatment from owners.

Housing 

 Mission Hábitathas as its goal the construction of new housing units for the poor. The program also seeks to develop agreeable and integrated housing zones that make available a full range of social servicesfrom education to healthcarewhich likens its vision to that of new urbanism.
 Great Mission Housing Venezuela is the latest expansion of the housing missions since 2011.
 Great Mission New Neighborhood, Tricolor Neighborhoodconducts house rehabilitation projects since 2009.

Identification 

 Mission Identidadprovides Venezuelan national identity cards to facilitate access to the social services provided by other Missions.

Indigenous rights 

 Mission Guaicaipuro (launched October 2003)carried out by the Venezuelan Ministry of Environment and Natural Resources, this program seeks to restore communal land titles and human rights to Venezuela's numerous indigenous communities, in addition to defending their rights against resource and financial speculation.

Land reform 

 Mission Zamora an integrated land reform and land redistribution program in Venezuela. Several large landed estates and factories have been, or are in the process of being expropriated to stimulate the agricultural sector, create more economic activity and to redistribute wealth to the poor.

Rural development 

 Mission Vuelta al Campo ("Return to the Countryside"; announced mid– 2005)seeks to encourage impoverished and unemployed urban Venezuelans to willingly return to the countryside.
 Mission Árbol (Mission Tree, announced June 2006)seeks to recover Venezuelan forests and to involve the rural population to stop harm to forests through from slash/burn practices by promoting more sustainable agriculture, such as growing coffee or cocoa. The projects aim to achieve this through self-organization of the local populations.

Science 

 Mission Ciencia ("Mission Science" launched February 2006)includes a project to train 400,000 people in open source software, and scholarships for graduate studies and the creation of laboratories in different universities.

Socioeconomic transformation 

 Mission Vuelvan Caras ("Mission Turn Faces")has as its objective the transformation of the present Venezuelan economy to one that is oriented towards social, rather than fiscal and remunerative, goals. It seeks to facilitate increased involvement of ordinary citizens in programs of endogenous and sustainable social development, emphasizing in particular the involvement of traditionally marginalized or excluded Venezuelan social and economic sectors, including those participating in Venezuela's significant "informal" economy. The mission's ultimate goal, according to Hugo Chávez, is to foster an economy that brings "a quality and dignified life for all". In January 2006, Chávez declared that, after fulfilling the first stage of the mission, the goal of the second stage will be to turn every "endogenous nuclei of development" into "military nuclei of resistance against American imperialism" as part of a continuous program to create "citizen militias".

Civilian militia 

 Mission Mirandaestablishes a Venezuelan military reserve composed of civilians who could participate in the defense of the Venezuelan territory, in the legacy of the militias during the Spanish colonial period and the struggle for independence.

Culture 

 Mission Música – helps the development of music by encouraging young people to take up music-related careers as well as to revive traditional Venezuelan folk music.

International assistance

Cuba 
Many of these programs involve importing expertise from abroad; Venezuela is providing Cuba with 53,000 barrels (8,000 m3) of below-market-rate oil a day in exchange for the service of thousands of physicians, teachers, sports trainers, and other skilled professionals.

In February 2010 seven Cuban doctors who defected to the US introduced an indictment against the governments of Cuba and Venezuela and the oil company PDVSA for what they considered was a conspiracy to force them to work under conditions of "modern slaves" as payment for the Cuban government' debt. In 2014, it was reported by Miami NGO, Solidarity Without Borders, that at least 700 Cuban medical personnel had left Venezuela in the past year and that up to hundreds of Cuban personnel had asked for advice on how to escape from Venezuela weekly. Solidarity Without Borders also stated that Cuban personnel cannot refuse to work, cannot express complaints and suffer with blackmail from threats against their family in Cuba.

Impact 
The development and promotion of economic resources, originating from the state-owned Petróleos de Venezuela (PDVSA), generated a political floor for the governmental management of that time, but that "as the years went by, many social missions lost their social perspective and focused their axis of action on political activities" characterized by discretionality and information opacity.

The Bolivarian missions have been praised for their effect on poverty, education and health, and are described as "ways to combat extreme forms of exclusion" and "the mainstay of progress in the fight against poverty."

On the other hand, the Chávez government overspent on social spending without saving enough for economic distress, which Venezuela experienced shortly before and after Hugo Chávez's death and during the economic policy of the Nicolás Maduro government. Poverty, inflation and shortages then began to increase.

A multi-university study in 2015 questioned the effectiveness of the Bolivarian missions, showing that only 10% of Venezuelans studied benefited from the missions. Of that 10%, almost half were not affected from poverty. According to El Universal, experts stated that the missions actually worsened economic conditions in the country.

Health care
Mission Barrio Adentro, one of the flagship Bolivarian Missions of the widest social impact, drew praise from the Latin American branch of the World Health Organization and UNICEF.

Barrio Adentro, however, has been criticized for poor working conditions of Cuban workers, funding irregularities, and an estimated 80% of Barrio Adentro establishments abandoned with some structures filled with trash or becoming unintentional shelters for the homeless.

The infant mortality rate went down 5.9% between 1999 and 2013. The Gini coefficient fell from 47.8 in 1999 to 44.8 in 2006. The government earmarked 44.6% of the 2007 budget for social investment, with 1999–2007 averaging 12.8% of GDP.

Poverty
During the Chávez's presidency, poverty fell from 49.4% in 1999 to 30.2% in 2006 and extreme poverty went down from 21.7% to 9.9% in the same period according to the United Nations Economic Commission for Latin America and the Caribbean (ECLAC). However, the ECLAC showed a nearly 7% jump in poverty in 2013, from 25.4% in 2012 increasing to 32.1% in 2013.

In a multi-university study by the Andrés Bello Catholic University (UCAB), the Central University of Venezuela (UCV) and the Simon Bolivar University (USB), a comparison to the Venezuelan government's National Statistics Institute (INE) showed that overall poverty trends eventually reversed and increased between 1999 and 2015, rising from approximately 45% in 1999 to 48.4% in 2015 according to the study performed by universities. Months later, the same universities found that 73% of Venezuelan households lived in poverty, with poverty increasing over 24% in about one year.

Sustainability of missions
From the beginning of the Bolivarian missions and past Chávez's death, the sustainability of the missions was questioned. The Bolivarian government's over dependence on oil funds for large populist policies led to overspending on social programs and strict government policies created difficulties for Venezuela's import reliant businesses. Foreign Policy described Chávez's Venezuela as "one of the worst cases of Dutch Disease in the world" due to the Bolivarian government's large dependence on oil sales and its lavish spending to please voters.

Focus on the missions was increased during political campaigns in Venezuela, with Chávez often overspending to fund their popularity. Following elections, government interest in the missions would then decline and their effectiveness would be negatively affected. The lack of institutional organization–many missions had existing government services that only increased costs–and the "revolutionary" approach which often caused inefficient improvisation would eventually jeopardize the sustainability of the missions.

As a result of Chávez's policies, the durability of Bolivarian missions was put to the test shortly before and after Chávez's death, when poverty increased, inflation rose and widespread shortages in Venezuela occurred, with such effects growing especially into the presidency of Nicolas Maduro. In 2014, Venezuela entered an economic recession. Estimates of poverty by the United Nations Economic Commission for Latin America and the Caribbean (ECLAC) and Luis Pedro España, a sociologist at the Universidad Católica Andrés Bello, show an increase in poverty. ECLAC showed a 2013 poverty rate of 32% while Pedro España calculated a 2015 rate of 48% with a poverty rate of 70% possible by the end of 2015. According to Venezuelan NGO PROVEA, by the end of 2015, there would be the same number of Venezuelans living in poverty as there was in 2000, reversing the advancements against poverty by Hugo Chávez.

Notes

References
 .

External links 
  Gobierno en Línea: MisionesOfficial government website detailing the Bolivarian Missions.
  Instituto Nacional de Estadística (English auto-translate)Venezuela's National Institute of Statistics; has web several portals for accessing demographic and economic data related to the impact of Bolivarian Missions.

 
Politics of Venezuela